The Dells Mill is located in Augusta, Wisconsin, United States. It was added to the National Register of Historic Places in 1974.

History
The structure was built as a gristmill. A mill pond was created near-by. Currently, the site is used as a museum.

References

External links

 Dells Mill and Museum

Grinding mills on the National Register of Historic Places in Wisconsin
Industrial buildings completed in 1864
Mill museums in Wisconsin
Museums in Eau Claire County, Wisconsin
Grinding mills in Wisconsin
National Register of Historic Places in Eau Claire County, Wisconsin
1864 establishments in Wisconsin